Tarsus is an impact crater in the Oxia Palus quadrangle of Mars.

Tarsus is located in Chryse Planitia, north of the crater Taxco and east of Naar.

References 

Oxia Palus quadrangle
Impact craters on Mars